
Francis William Pitt Greenwood (February 5, 1797 - August 2, 1843) was a Unitarian minister of King's Chapel in Boston, Massachusetts.

Born in Boston, Greenwood graduated from Harvard College in 1814, and after studying theology under Henry Ware Jr., he became pastor of New South Church in October, 1818. He left this position after about a year, following a sudden illness of "bleeding from the lungs," and spent nearly two years in England.

After returning to the United States in 1821, he lived for a time in Baltimore, Maryland, where he preached in the pulpit of the Unitarian Church led by his friend, Rev. Jared Sparks and married Maria Goodwin of Baltimore, by whom they had one son.

In the summer of 1824, he returned to Boston to become associate minister of King's Chapel, serving under his mentor, James Freeman, of whom he would later write his biography. In 1827, following Freeman's death, Greenwood revised the church's liturgy and later prepared a popular hymnbook, which was adopted by many other churches. During his tenure, he established a Sunday School for children of the parish. His pastorate was interrupted various times by a recurrence of illness, and in 1837, he traveled to Cuba on the advice of doctors.

He wrote for and edited the Christian Examiner throughout the 1820s and 1830s,. His 1826 series, "Letters on Missions," was especially noted as being controversial for its severity in tone. Greenwood's writings were also published in the Boston Journal of Natural History and The Token and Atlantic Souvenir.

He preached his last sermon on May 22, 1842, at a church in Salem, Massachusetts and died August 2, 1843, at the age of 46, due to his lingering illness.

His sermons were published in 1844 in two volumes by his friend a parishioner, former Boston Mayor Samuel A. Eliot.

References

Further reading

Works by Greenwood
 A Sermon delivered on the twenty-fifth anniversary of the Boston Female Asylum, Sept. 23, 1825. 
 Greenwood and G.B. Emerson, eds. The classical reader. 1826.
 Funeral sermon on the late Hon. Christopher Gore: formerly governor of Massachusetts. Preached at King's Chapel, Boston, March 11, 1827. Boston: Wells and Lilly, 1827.
 Lives of the twelve apostles. 1828.
 Prayer for the Sick: A Sermon Preached at King's Chapel, Boston, on Thursday, August 9, 1932, Being the Fast Day Appointed by the Governor of Massachusetts, On Account of the Appearance of Cholera in the United States. Boston: L.C. Bowles, 1832.
 A History of King's Chapel, in Boston. 1833.
 Memoir of the Rev. James Freeman. Collections of the Massachusetts Historical Society. 1836.
 Spring. The Token and Atlantic Souvenir. 1838.
 A Description of the principal fruits of Cuba. Boston Journal of Natural History, Volume 2. 1839.
 The Sea. The Boston Book, Volume 3. Boston: Light and Horton, 1841.
 Sermons to Children. Boston: James Munroe, 1841.
 The Spirit's Song of Consolation. American common-place book of poetry. 1841.
 Sermons of the Rev. F.W.P. Greenwood, in Two Volumes. Boston: Charles C. Little and James Brown, 1844.
2nd ed., 1835. 3rd ed., 1846.

Works about Greenwood

External links
 WorldCat. Greenwood, F. W. P. (Francis William Pitt) 1797-1843

19th-century Unitarian clergy
1797 births
1843 deaths
Place of death missing
Clergy from Boston
19th-century American people
American Unitarians
American Unitarian clergy
Harvard College alumni
19th-century American clergy